The 1987 European Weightlifting Championships were held in Reims, France from May 3 to May 9, 1987. This was the 66th edition of the event. There were 160 men in action.

Medal summary

Medal table
Ranking by Big (Total result) medals

References
Results (Chidlovski.net)
Панорама спортивного года 1987 / Сост. Ю. С. Лукашин — М.: Физкультура и спорт, 1988. 

European Weightlifting Championships
European Weightlifting Championships
European Weightlifting Championships
International weightlifting competitions hosted by France
Sport in Reims